Lady Killer or Ladykiller may refer to:

Literature

Books
 The Lady-Killer, a 1902 book by Henry De Vere Stacpoole
 Lady Killer (novel), a 1951 novel by Anthony Gilbert
 Lady Killer, a 1958 novel by Ed McBain
 The Lady Killer, a 1993 novel written by Martina Cole
 Lady Killer, a novel in the Rosato & Associates series

Comics and short stories
 Lady Killer, a character in the Strangers (Malibu Comics) series
 Lady Killer (comic book), a comic book series by Joëlle Jones and Jamie S. Rich, published by Dark Horse Comics since 2015
 "Lady Killer", a story in the DC Comics anthology Weird Mystery Tales

Film and television

Films
 The Lady Killer (film), a 1913 silent short
 Lady Killer (1933 film), starring James Cagney
 Lady Killer (1937 film), directed by Jean Grémillon
 Lady Killer (1968 film), a Hindi language film
 Lady Killer (1992 film), a 1992 Yugoslavian film
 Lady Killer (1995 film), a drama directed by Steven Schachter
 Scene of the Crime (1996 film), also known as Ladykiller, starring Ben Gazzara
 Lady Killer (2022 film), a Hindi language action-drama film produced by Shailesh R Singh

Television
 "Lady Killer" (Person of Interest), an episode of Person of Interest
 "Lady Killer", an episode of Charlie's Angels
 "Lady Killer", as episode of The Lone Ranger
 "Lady Killer", the first episode of Thriller
 "Lady Killer", an episode of The New Breed
 "Lady Killer", an episode of Riptide
 "Lady Killer", an episode of the reality series Life of Ryan
 "The Lady Killer", an episode of The Roy Rogers Show
 "The Lady Killer", half of a Cold Case Files episode
 "The Lady Killer", an episode of Pretty Little Liars

Music
The Lady Killer (album), a 2010 album by CeeLo Green
"Lady Killer" (Kreesa Turner song), by Canadian singer Kreesha Turner
"Ladykillers", a song by UK shoegazer/Britpop outfit Lush
"Lady Killer", a song on the John Entwistle album Mad Dog
"Lady Killer", from the 2000 Spitfire album Race Riot
"Ladykiller", a Maroon 5 song on the album Overexposed
"Lady Killer", a Lita Ford song on the album Dancin' on the Edge
"Lady Killer", from the debut album Flash and the Pan
"Lady Killa", by British singer M.I.A. (rapper)
"Lady Killer", a Racer X song on the album Second Heat
"Lady Killer" by Andrew Jackson Jihad from the album Candy Cigarettes and Cap Guns
"Ladykiller", by the Vandals, from their When in Rome Do as The Vandals album
"Ladykiller", a song by The Saturdays from the All Fired Up single
"Lady Killer", a song by Priestess from the album Prior to the Fire

Other uses
Lady Killer, a variety of snow crocus

See also
Ladykillers (disambiguation)